Rustia is a genus of cicadas in the family Cicadidae. There are at least two described species in Rustia.

Species
These two species belong to the genus Rustia:
 Rustia dentivitta (Walker, F., 1862) c g
 Rustia tigrina (Distant, 1888) c g
Data sources: i = ITIS, c = Catalogue of Life, g = GBIF, b = Bugguide.net

References

Further reading

 
 
 
 

Leptopsaltriini
Cicadidae genera